Princess Mary may refer to:

People
 Mary of York (1467–1482), daughter of Edward IV of England 
 Mary Tudor, Queen of France (1496–1533), daughter of Henry VII of England
 Mary of Woodstock 14th century english Princess and Nun
 Queen Mary I of England (1516–1558), known as "Princess Mary" before her accession
 Princess Mary of England (1605–1607), daughter of James VI and I
 Mary, Princess Royal and Princess of Orange (1631–1660), daughter of Charles I of England
 Queen Mary II of England (1662–1694), daughter of James VII and II, queen of Scotland & Ireland, wife of King William III, of the House of Orange, and joint ruler with him
 Princess Mary of Great Britain (1723–1772), daughter of George II of Great Britain
 Princess Mary, Duchess of Gloucester and Edinburgh (1776–1857), daughter of George III of the United Kingdom
 Princess Mary Adelaide of Cambridge (1833–1897), granddaughter of George III of the United Kingdom
 Princess Mary of Teck (1867–1953), great-granddaughter of George III of the United Kingdom, Queen consort of George V
 Mary, Princess Royal and Countess of Harewood (1897–1965), daughter of George V of the United Kingdom
 Mary, Crown Princess of Denmark (born 1972), Australian-born wife of Frederik, Crown Prince of Denmark

Ships
 HMS Princess Mary, ships of the Royal Navy
 SS Princess Mary, a Canadian Pacific British Columbia coast ferry
 Princess Mary (1796 ship), an East India Company "extra ship", later a West Indiaman

Other
 Princess Mary (film), a 1955 Soviet comedy film
 Princess Mary High School, a former school in Halifax, Yorkshire, England
 Princess Mary Lake, in Nunavut, Canada
 Princess Mary Christmas gift box, distributed in World War I
 Princess Mary's Gift Book, a World War I relief book illustrated by Edmund Dulac

See also
 Princess Marie (disambiguation)
 Queen Mary (disambiguation)